Zip 'n' Snort is a 1961 Warner Bros. Merrie Melodies cartoon directed by Chuck Jones. The short was released on January 21, 1961, and stars Wile E. Coyote and the Road Runner.

Plot
Introduction: Wile E. Coyote (everreadii eatibus) points at the text with his scientific name, then points at himself, saying that the text is talking about him, before he is scared up into the sky by the Road Runner (digoutius hot-rodis), who then starts the chase after he comes down. The chase continues, until they reach a tunnel in which the Road Runner leaves the path, allowing a truck to chase Wile E. He eventually runs away from the truck & sticks his tongue out at it, but does not watch where he's going & walks off the edge of a cliff, & upon seeing the situation, he puts his tongue back in & looks at the audience surprised, pointing at the ground, before he hits a cliff & falls off. The Road Runner arrives at the cliff & Wile E. climbs the cliff to continue the chase, but the second he's almost at the top, the precipice falls off with Wile E. at the top. Angered, he then begins thinking of his next plots.

1. A simple plan of simply loading himself into a bow leads to a simple denouement: running into the wood instead of going towards the bird.

2. Rather than face the Road Runner directly, Wile E. uses a grenade mounted on top of a model airplane to take out the Road Runner from above. However, when he sets the propeller in motion, only the propeller flies into the air. The Coyote soon figures out the situation and throws the entire model airplane into the air, but the grenade still remains in the air, spinning behind the surprised Coyote before exploding.

3. Returning to simplicity, Wile E. uses a wedge to throw a large rock, but it results in self-squashing.

4. This time, Wile E. lays out Acme iron pellets covered with Ajax (Disney) bird seed for the Road Runner to eat, while lying in wait on a high cliff with a magnet on a fishing line. However, the magnet attaches itself to a power line, electrocuting the Coyote twice and causing his nose to flash like a light bulb. The Coyote unscrews his nose and gazes at its flashing, looking amused.

5. The Coyote then attempts to load a cannon, but as he pounds in the cannonball with a stick, the cannon fires the two items out of it, with the Coyote still hanging on to the stick. Gravity results, and Wile E. and the stick land into the ground, to be pounded down by the cannonball.

6. Wile E. now lies in wait on top of a cliff with another, but much larger cannon as the Road Runner munches on more birdseed. The Coyote turns the cannon downwards as he goes to light the fuse, but the cannon falls off its mount, taking the Coyote down with it. He runs himself off to the right and finds the cannon facing him. Wile E. gropes downwards to escape the cannon's fire, but the cannon faces him again, but is now hovering right over his head. Wile E. sighs and soon realizes the inevitable, and is then swallowed by the cannon. The Road Runner moves out of the way as the cannon (with the Coyote inside) hits the ground. Then the cannon fires, sending it back up to its mount, which also causes the precipice to break and to fall back down on the Coyote (who futilely holds up an umbrella).(The clip was later used to introduce Roadrunner -Coyote cartoons along with the Roadrunner-Coyote song on The Bugs Bunny-road Runner Show)

7. Hoping to out-corner his rival, Wile E. greases his feet with axle grease and glides across the mountaintop, but soon sees the edge of the cliff. With no alternative, he grabs onto a saguaro and gets speared by its spines and he cries out in pain. Now, he can spot the Road Runner's trajectory and leaps off down the mountain slope, but the Road Runner stops before he reaches Wile E.'s path, and instead of stopping in the middle of the road, Wile E. continues down the mountain and drops off it, and then onto the power lines seen earlier. Wile E. surfs these with no way to stop himself, but when he reaches the ground, he moves directly onto a railroad track, complete with an approaching train. But before it hits the Coyote, he moves onto a side track. Wile E. points happily at the receding train, but now sees he's going into a tunnel with another train coming out of it. Wile E. strokes himself against the wind, barely keeping pace, and then the camera pans up to show the train is labeled: "New York Express / Non Stop". The camera cuts up again to the Road Runner in the engineer's compartment, apparently enjoying the prospect of chasing his opponent 2,500 miles across the United States.

Crew
Story: Chuck Jones
Animation: Richard Thompson, Bob Bransford, Tom Ray and Ken Harris
Layouts: Maurice Noble
Backgrounds: Philip DeGuard
Film Editor: Treg Brown
Voice Characterizations: Mel Blanc and Paul Julian
Music: Milt Franklyn
Produced by David H. DePatie and John W. Burton
Directed by Chuck Jones

References

External links
 
 

Merrie Melodies short films
Wile E. Coyote and the Road Runner films
Short films directed by Chuck Jones
1961 animated films
Films scored by Milt Franklyn
1961 short films
Animated films about mammals
Animated films about birds
1960s Warner Bros. animated short films
Animated films without speech
American animated short films
Films about Canis